Escadrille Spa.153 (originally Escadrille N.153) was a French fighter squadron active from 1 July 1917 to war's end. It was Mentioned in dispatches for its proficiency. By the Armistice, the squadron was credited with 10 German airplanes and three observation balloons destroyed.

History
Escadrille Spa.153 was established at Étampes-Montdesir, France on 1 July 1917 with Nieuport 24 fighters; it was then dubbed Escadrille N.153. A week after its founding, it was assigned to a provisional Group de Combat to support a French field army, III Armee. In November 1917, the squadron was reinforced by improved Nieuport 24bis fighters, even as it began to receive SPAD VIIs and SPAD XIIIs. After its refitting with the SPADs, it became known as Escadrille Spa.153. 

On 20 January 1918, Escadrille Spa.153 was posted to Groupe de Combat 18. The squadron served with this Groupe through moves to fight for a number of French field armies. On 9 September, it began fighting for the American 1st Army at the Battle of Saint-Mihiel. It was withdrawn to IV Armee on the 24th, and served there until war's end. On 4 October 1918, it was Mentioned in dispatches. The squadron was credited with downing 10 German aircraft and three observation balloons.

Commanding officers
 Lieutenant Jean Gigadot: 1 July 1917 - 21 September 1918
 Lieutenant Yvan Viguier: 21 September 1918 - war's end

Notable members
 Sous lieutenant Andre Barcat
 Adjutant Georges Halberger

Aircraft
 Nieuport 24: 1 July 1917
 Nieuport 24bis: November 1917
 SPAD VII: November 1917
 SPAD XIII: November 1917

End notes

Reference

 Franks, Norman; Bailey, Frank (1993). Over the Front: The Complete Record of the Fighter Aces and Units of the United States and French Air Services, 1914–1918 London, UK: Grub Street Publishing. .

Fighter squadrons of the French Air and Space Force
Military units and formations established in 1917
Military units and formations disestablished in 1918
Military units and formations of France in World War I
Military aviation units and formations in World War I